Pilot Township is a township in Iowa County, Iowa, USA.

History
Pilot Township was established in 1862.

References

Townships in Iowa County, Iowa
Townships in Iowa
1862 establishments in Iowa